Holy Trinity Church, Bradford, was an Anglican parish church located in Leeds Road, Bradford, West Yorkshire, England. It was built in 1864–65 to a design by the Lancaster architect E. G. Paley at an estimated cost of £3,565 (equivalent to £ in ).  The church was constructed in stone, its architectural style being Decorated.  It had north and south five-bay aisles, and a southeast tower.  In 1871 a broach spire was added, the chancel arch was rebuilt, and the tower was underpinned because of subsidence, the architects being Paley and Austin.

The church was demolished in 1966, and the parish merged with that of St Clement's.

See also

List of ecclesiastical works by E. G. Paley
List of ecclesiastical works by Paley and Austin
St. George's Episcopal Memorial Church, a church in the US with a stained glass window containing shards of glass collected from this church when it was damaged in World War II.

References
Citations

Sources

Former Church of England church buildings
Gothic Revival church buildings in England
Gothic Revival architecture in West Yorkshire
Churches completed in 1864
19th-century Church of England church buildings
Church buildings by E. G. Paley
Buildings and structures demolished in 1966
Demolished buildings and structures in England